Oxya nitidula is a species of grasshopper in the family Acrididae. It is a pest of millets such as sorghum and pearl millet in India.

References

nitidula
Insect pests of millets